Ann Snodgrass is an American poet and translator.

Life
She graduated from University of Iowa, Johns Hopkins University, and from University of Utah with a Ph.D.

She lived in the Netherlands, where she taught at Emerson College in Maastricht.

She currently lives in Iowa City, IA, under the pseudonyms "Sample Lady" and "Bagel Lady."

Her work appeared in AGNI, The Harvard Review, American Letters & Commentary, Ploughshares, Paris Review, and TriQuarterly.

Awards
 2004 Raiziss/de Palchi Fellowship
 Fulbright Foundation
 PEN American Center Renato Poggioli Award
 Massachusetts Arts Lottery grant

Work

Poetry
 
  chapbook

Translations

Essays

References

Year of birth missing (living people)
Living people
University of Iowa alumni
Johns Hopkins University alumni
University of Utah alumni
Emerson College faculty
Italian–English translators
Berklee College of Music faculty